Edda Seippel (19 December 1919 – 12 May 1993) was a German actress. She appeared in more than 70 films and television shows between 1937 and 1992.

Filmography

References

External links

1919 births
1993 deaths
German film actresses
Actors from Braunschweig
German television actresses
20th-century German actresses